Ronald Edmond Braden (August 28, 1948 – November 6, 2012) was an American football and baseball coach.  He served as the head football coach at Fisk University in Nashville, Tennessee from 1980 to 1981, tallying a mark of 0–17.  Braden was also the head baseball coach at Fisk from 1980 to 1981 and at Kentucky State University from 1988 to 1995, compiling a career college baseball coaching record of 109–245–3.  Braden died at the age of 64, on   November 6, 2012, in Frankfort, Kentucky.

Head coaching record

Football

References

1948 births
2012 deaths
Fisk Bulldogs baseball coaches
Fisk Bulldogs football coaches
Kentucky State Thorobreds baseball coaches
Kentucky State Thorobreds basketball coaches
Tennessee State Tigers baseball coaches
Tennessee State University alumni
College golf coaches in the United States
College women's volleyball coaches in the United States
Sportspeople from Detroit
People from Marshall County, Tennessee
Basketball coaches from Tennessee
African-American coaches of American football
African-American baseball coaches
African-American basketball coaches
20th-century African-American sportspeople
21st-century African-American sportspeople